The ISU Challenger Series is a series of international figure skating competitions. Established by the International Skating Union in the 2014–15 season, it is a group of senior-level events ranked below the ISU Grand Prix of Figure Skating. Each event consists of at least three disciplines out of four (men's singles, ladies' singles, pair skating, and ice dancing), and is required to take place between August 1 and December 15.

The ISU Challenger Series Synchronized Skating is a separate competition series in the discipline of synchronized skating.

History
The ISU Council decided to create the series at its February 2014 meeting. Eleven competitions were selected in June 2014. The Triglav Trophy dropped out by October 10, 2014, resulting in a series composed of ten events. The Nebelhorn Trophy, Finlandia Trophy, Ondrej Nepela Memorial, and Golden Spin of Zagreb are the "core group". The event criteria were published in April 2014, and revised in August 2014.

The notice on the ISU Challenger Series Synchronized Skating was announced on May 10, 2019, which is for the discipline of synchronized skating and is held separately from the other ISU Challenger Series. 

Asian Open Classic was planned to be included in the 2019–20 season, but ISU transferred the event holding right back to Asian Open Trophy later.

In the 2020–21 season, due to the COVID-19 pandemic, it was decided to hold the Challenger competitions as individual events, rather than as a series. Entry limits per country were also removed.

Events

Top three finishers per season
Each skater or team is permitted to compete in up to three ISU Challenger Series events. Their two highest scores determine the final ranking.

Men

Ladies

Pairs

Ice dance

Top finishers standings

Top scores per season

Men

Ladies

Pairs

Ice dance

Prize money 
At the end of the series, prize money is awarded to skaters who finished in the top three in each discipline in the final ranking. In pairs and ice dancing, the partners split the prize money.

From the 2014–15 season through to the 2019–2020 season:

References

External links 
 Challenger Series at the International Skating Union

 
Figure skating tours and series